Verapaz (or Vera Paz) may refer to the following places and jurisdictions :

 Verapaz, Guatemala, a region of colonial Guatemala, now divided into :
 Baja Verapaz Department, with its capital at Salamá
 Alta Verapaz Department, with its capital at Cobán
 and Roman Catholic Diocese of Vera Paz, with see in the above Cobán, covering both
 Verapaz, El Salvador, a municipality in El Salvador

See also 
 San Cristóbal Verapaz, a municipality in Alta Verapaz, Guatemala
 Santa Cruz Verapaz, a municipality in Alta Verapaz, Guatemala